Hairy crab may refer to:

Pilumnus hirtellus, a species of European crab 
Chinese mitten crab, also known as "Shanghai hairy crab" and used in cuisine

Animal common name disambiguation pages